England Boxing, known until 2013 as the Amateur Boxing Association of England, is the governing body of amateur boxing clubs in England. There are separate organisations for Scotland and Wales with boxing in Northern Ireland being organised on an All-Ireland basis. The Association was founded in 1880.

In 1881, it organised the first ABA Championships the following year. From 2008 the Championships were known as the ABAE National Championships and then from 2014 until 2018 they were known as the England Boxing National Elite Championships. Another name change followed in 2019 which is the current name, known as the England Boxing National Amateur Championships.

Lists of England Boxing National Amateur Championships Champions 
 Light-Flyweight
 Flyweight
 Bantamweight
 Featherweight
 Lightweight
 Light-Welterweight
 Welterweight
 Light-Middleweight
 Middleweight
 Light-Heavyweight
 Cruiserweight
 Heavyweight
 Super-Heavyweight

References

External links
 

 
England
Amateur boxing organizations
Boxing in England
1880 establishments in England
Amateur sport in the United Kingdom
Organisations based in Sheffield